Magnesium pidolate, the magnesium salt of pidolic acid (also known as pyroglutamic acid), is a mineral supplement, which contains 8.6% magnesium w/w.

External links
 

Magnesium compounds
Salts of carboxylic acids